The provincial organization of volunteers and civil defence (Portuguese: organização provincial de voluntários e defesa civil) or OPVDC was a former militia type force in each of the Portuguese Overseas provinces. There were three such organizations raised by the Portuguese Government in their overseas provinces of Portuguese Angola, Portuguese Mozambique and Portuguese Timor.

The OPVDC had the tasks of auxiliary internal security force and civil defense organization, under the authority of the governor of the province. The OPVDC of Angola and Mozambique were engaged in the Portuguese Colonial War as auxiliary forces of the Portuguese Armed Forces.

In the Portuguese Overseas, the OPVDC were the correspondent of the Portuguese Legion in the European Portugal.

Angola
Provincial Organization of Volunteers of Civil Defence of Angola (OPVDCA) - mainly urban militia, consisting mainly of white settlers.

The OPVDCA was formed by officers of the asset or the reserve of the Armed Forces, but was dependent on the Civil Administration, and its maximum in the Governor-General of the province. The function of OPVDCA was essentially in defence of people, lines of communications and sensitive installations.

Members of OPVDCA volunteers were civilians who had their professions, serving in the organization part-time. Initially the OPVDCA was constituted only by white settlers, but later it became increasingly multi-racial.  At its peak the OPVDCA reached more than 40,000 staff.

Mozambique
Organização Provincial de Voluntários de Defesa Civil de Moçambique (OPVDCM) - (Provincial Organization of Volunteers of Civil Defence of Mozambique) (OPVDCM)

References
 ABBOT, Peter, RODRIGUES, Manuel, VOLSTAD, Ronald, Modern African Wars (2) - Angola and Mozambique 1961-74, Oxford: Osprey Publishing, 1988
 RODRIGUES, Manuel A. Ribeiro, SANTOS, Carlos Alberto, Campanhas Ultramarinas 1961-1974 - Exército (1), Lisbon: Destarte, 2000

See also
 Militia
 Portuguese Legion (Estado Novo)

Government paramilitary forces
Non-military counterinsurgency organizations